Samjhauta Express or Samjhota Express is a 2012 Pakistani drama television serial aired on PTV Home. Serial is written by Naeem Tahir, directed and produced by Ali Tahir. Serial stars Zeba Bakhtiar, Farhan Ally Agha, Noman Ijaz, Naeem Tahir, Ali Tahir and Nayyar Ejaz.

Cast and characters 
 Zeba Bakhtiar as Shaista
 Farhan Ally Agha as Azhar
 Nauman Ijaz as Purohit
 Bushra Ansari as Kaveeta Karkari
 Naeem Tahir
 Ali Tahir as Sajjad Mubeen
 Nayyar Ejaz as Bhatadia
 Asma Abbas as Kamini
 Irsa Ghazal as Pragya Singh Sadhvi
Amir Qureshi
 Nayyar Ejaz
 Omair Rana
 Tahira Syed
 Sara Razi as Ayesha
 Arisha Razi as Auesha (young)
 Zainab

References

External links 
 

Pakistan Television Corporation original programming
Urdu-language television shows
2012 Pakistani television series debuts
Pakistani drama television series